Maria Ana of Portugal may refer to:

 Mariana Victoria of Spain (1718–1781), queen consort of Joseph I of Portugal
 Infanta Mariana Victoria of Portugal (1768–1788), daughter of Mary I of Portugal and Peter III of Portugal, wife of Infante Gabriel of Spain
 Infanta Maria Anna of Portugal (1843–1884), daughter of Maria II of Portugal and Ferdinand II of Portugal, wife of George of Saxony
 Infanta Marie Anne of Portugal (1861–1942), titular infanta of Portugal, daughter of the usurper-king Miguel I of Portugal, wife of Guillaume IV, Grand Duke of Luxembourg

See also
Maria of Portugal (disambiguation)